Leiosaurus bellii, Bell's anole, is a species of lizard in the family Leiosauridae. It is native to Argentina.

References

Leiosaurus
Reptiles described in 1837
Reptiles of Argentina
Taxa named by André Marie Constant Duméril
Taxa named by Gabriel Bibron